The Sultan of Johor Cup is an annual, international under-21 men's field hockey tournament held in Malaysia.

Since the first edition held in 2011, five teams have emerged victorious. India and Great Britain are the most successful teams having won the tournament three times. Australia have won the tournament twice, followed by Germany and Malaysia who have all won the tournament once.

Results

Summaries

Successful national teams
Below is a list of teams that have finished in the top four positions in the tournament:

* = includes results representing England

Team appearances

* = includes results representing England

See also 
 Sultan Azlan Shah Cup
 Malaysian Hockey Confederation

References

External links